This is a graphical lifespan timeline of presidents of Russia.  The presidents are listed in order of office.

<div style="overflow:auto">

References

Graphical timelines